Bjacho Gewog (Dzongkha: བྱག་ཕྱོགས་), also spelled Bjagchhog, is a gewog (village block) of Chukha District, Bhutan. The gewog has an area of 140 square kilometres and contains 4 villages; Bjachho, Tsimakha, Mebesa and Wangkha.

References

Gewogs of Bhutan
Chukha District